The following streetcar lines once operated in the Bronx, New York City, New York, United States. Every line in the Bronx eventually came under control of the Third Avenue Railway.

See also
 List of streetcar lines in Brooklyn
 List of streetcar lines in Manhattan
 List of streetcar lines in Queens
 List of streetcar lines in Staten Island
 List of town tramway systems in the United States

References
Chicago Transit & Railfan Web Site: New York City Transit

 
Bronx
Bronx-related lists